The Philippine Council of Evangelical Churches (PCEC) is a national evangelical alliance, member of the World Evangelical Alliance. It has 78 Christian denominations members, and more than 200 para-church organizations in the Philippines. The head office is in Quezon City, Philippines.

History
The PCEC was established by evangelical denominations in 1965.

In 2011, Dr. Cesar Vicente P. Punzalan, Deputy National Director of the Philippine Council of Evangelical Churches, estimated that 12% of the population were members of PCEC churches.

The 2015 Philippine census by the Philippine Statistics Authority found that 2.4 percent of the population of 101 million were members of PCEC churches, making it the third largest faith group in the Philippines after the Catholic Church (79.5%) and Islam (6.0%), and down from 2.7% in 2010.

As of 2020, it has 78 Christian denominations and 200 member organizations.

See also
 National Council of Churches in the Philippines
 Christianity in the Philippines
 Evangelicalism in the Philippines

References

External links
 Official Website of the Philippine Council of Evangelical Churches

National evangelical alliances
Evangelicalism in the Philippines
Christian organizations established in 1965
1965 establishments in the Philippines